Maiden of Mysteries – The Music of Enya (1998) is the fourth album released by the Taliesin Orchestra, and is a tribute to the Irish singer Enya.  There have been three other Enya tribute albums released by the Orchestra: Orinoco Flow, An Instrumental Tribute to the Hits of Enya, and Thread of Time.

Track listing

"Anywhere" – 5:48
"Boadicea" – 5:03
"Before the Storm" – 2:48
"Storms in Africa" – 7:09
"Pax Deorum" – 4:41
"Only If..." – 6:01
"How Can I Keep from Singing?" – 5:59
"Ebudae" – 4:44
"Caribbean Blue" – 3:23
"Evacuee" – 3:54

Personnel

Rita Manning – Violin 
Pete Martinez – Engineer 
Jim McLeod – Violin 
Scott Meeder – Drums 
Rodney Mills – Mastering 
Peter Oxer – Violin 
Anthony Pleeth – Cello 
Maciej Rakowski – Violin 
Frank Ricotti – Tympani (Timpani) 
Terry Simpson – Mixing 
Jackie Street – Bass 
Hugh Webb – Harp 
Gavyn Wright – Violin, Concert Master 
Felicia Sorensen – Vocals, Vocals (Background), Vocal Arrangement 
Bill Benham – Violin 
Dermot Crehan – Violin 
Alfreda Gerald – Vocals 
Barry Gibbons – Engineer 
Vaughan Armon – Violin 
Martin Robinson – Cello 
Boguslaw Kostecki – Violin 
Justin Pearson – Cello 
Taliesin Orchestra – Main Performer 
Rolf Wilson – Violin 
Cathy Giles – Cello 
Perry Montague-Mason – Violin 
John Briglevich – Engineer 
Paul Gardham – French Horn 
John Pigneguy – French Horn 
Jeff Wack – Copyist 
Richard Watkins – French Horn 
Darryl Tibbs – Percussion 
Lisa Sayre – Horn (English), Oboe 
Paul Cullington – Contrabass 
James Majors – Engineer, Assistant Engineer 
Claudius Craig – Production Assistant 
Rebecca Hirsch – Violin 
Hugh Seenan – French Horn 
Kylie Hunt – Graphic Design 
John Maschinot – Uilleann pipes 
Charles Sayre – Arranger, Liner Notes, Conductor 
Karen Briggs – Violin 
Mark Berrow – Violin 
Ronnie Brookshire – Engineer 
Ben Cruft – Violin 
Roger Garland – Violin 
Wilfred Gibson – Violin 
Bill Hatcher – Banjo, Autoharp, Bass, Mandolin, Guitar 
John Heley – Cello 
Paul Kegg – Cello 
Ricky Keller – Bass, Mixing 
Gary Kettel – Percussion 
Chris Laurence – Contrabass 
Martin Loveday – Cello 
Jo-El Sonnier – Accordion 
Brian Jobson – Assistant Engineer 
Trammell Starks – Keyboards, Mixing, Liner Notes, Producer, Programming 
Butch Baldassari – Mandolin

Trivia

The lead vocalist, Felicia Sorensen, is a member of the Church of Jesus Christ of Latter-day Saints.

See also

Taliesin Orchestra
Orinoco Flow – The Music of Enya

References

1998 albums
Enya tribute albums
Taliesin Orchestra albums